Abdur-Raheem Adebayo Shittu (born 23 March 1953) is the former Minister of Communications of the Federal Republic of Nigeria. He is from Oyo State, Nigeria, His tenure as Minister ended in 2019.

Before becoming minister, he had earlier served as a member of the Oyo State House of Assembly, becoming the youngest Honourable member at age 26, to take the office.

Early life and education

Honorable Adebayo Shittu gained admission into University of Ife, now Obafemi Awolowo University, Ile-Ife, Osun South West, Nigeria in the year 1974. At the end of 1978, he had obtained his first degree in Law from the same university. He ventured into politics at the age of 26 years. In 1979, he became a member of old Oyo House of Assembly.

Career

In 1983, Barr Shittu was elected as a member of Oyo State, House Assembly in the second republic. In 1983, the military government took over from the civilian government and he retired into legal practice and writing profession. He became a Member of National Political conference in 2005. In 2011, he Contested of Gubernatorial ticket under the platform of C.P.C and lost out to the incumbent of Late, senator Abiola Ajimobi. During the first tenure of the administration of President Muhammadu Buhari, he was appointed as the Minister of communications in Nigeria from the year 2015 - 2019.

Books
Shittu has written the following books 
 Islam and Christianity: Why the conflict? - 1979, 
 A modern introduction to Islam - 1979, 
 Muslim Prayers for Everyday Success - 1985, 
 What is Sunnan? What is Bidi'a?-1996
 The position of Islam on interest (Ribbah) Derivable from current Accounts,Savings Account and Fixed deposit-1996
Daawah: the duty of every Muslim-1994
A Book of Qur'anic parables-2015
Path to Democratic socialism in Nigeria-1979
Justice in the shari'ah-1981
Islam for the sake of humanity-1998
Al-qur'anic: the first book of science-1994
A critique of Dr Adekilekum Tijjani's Handbook on the Tijjaniya-1996
Muslim path of paradise-1994

Political offices
Honourable Member of the Oyo State House of Assembly in the Second Republic in 1979
Oyo State Commissioner for Information, Culture and Home Affairs (in the Victor Omololu Olunloyo administration) between October and December, 1983
Attorney General and Oyo State Commissioner for Justice (in the Rashidi Adewolu Ladoja government)
Member of the National Political Reforms Conference in 2005
Minister of Communications. 2015-2019

Achievements And Contributions To Socio-Economic Growth

Contributions To The Party
Donated 2 Nos (18 seater Buses) to the Oyo state chapters of the All Progressives Congress
Donated a total of 5 nos (18 seater Buses) to the following Local Government chapters of All Progressives Congress. 1) APC,Saki Local Government chapter.2)APC Ogbomoso North local Government chapters. 3) APC Ido Local Government chapters.4) APC Ogbomoso South Local Government chapters.5)APC Egbeda Local Government chapters

Contributions To Society
Built 3 nos mechanised water Boreholes in part of Shaki-West Local Government Area of Oke-Ogun in Oyo state. In addition to a 4th one located by MTN foundation located at 1) Beside Kakako compound. 2) Beside Shehu Aluminium compound Aiyekale shaki-west.3) Opposite kinnikinnick primary school
Built 3 nos mechanised water Boreholes in part of Iseyin Local Government in Oke-Ogun in Area of Oyo Boreholes in 6 different local Government Area of Ibadan land. 1)Aba Alfa bus-stop olomi Area Oluyole LGA 2) Aiyekale Bus-stop,ona-ara LGA. 3)Lanes C.A.C Oke Imola Area. 4)lanes bus-stop Aremo Ibadan north 5) Beside lam Adesina former office oba adentunji,way

Education And I.C.T Developments
facilitated the donation/construction of a 250,000,000,00 (Two hundred and fifty million naira only) Computer ICT hub at the Oke-Ogun Polytechnic.
facilitated of the Donations/Constructions of ICT schools knowledge at some several schools. 1) Oriya aperin boy's high schools. 2)Oolo community grammar school. 3)Abiodon Atiba grammar school,kosobo Oyo  4)Muslim grammar school, oke taasi school 5)Koshin community grammar school Igbeti road koshi. 6)Muslim high school Igbeti
Facilitated the establishment of a multi million naira ict Center hub at Shaki parapo high school sango Shaki
facilitated the installation of a wide area network (WAN)at Ibadan polytechnic
facilitated the on-going construction of a multi million naira ict at Women development centre,Samoda Ibadan
facilitated the donations of multi million naira ict at FCE Ibadan
facilitated establishment of a police secondary school at Igboora in Ibarapa land
Sponsored 12 citizens of Oyo State at master's degree level
Actively promoted the establishment of an ICT park of the ministry of communication within the Abuja technology village
Establishment of ICT Development Bank
Initiated the repositioning of the Nigeria postal service(NIPOST)
Establishment
Nipost microfinance bank
Nipost property and development company ltd
NIPOST transport and logistics company Ltd
NIPOST E-commerce service company Ltd
NIPOST E-government service company Ltd
NIPOST digital service company Ltd

I.C.T Related Conferences
Head Nigeria delegation to the international telecommunication union (I.T.U). world radio communication conference.Geneva, Switzerland
The 2-Side event on "Dot Africa GTLD: Hope for realising Africa's digital presence and digital economy and sustainable development New York U.S .A
GSM mobile world Congress Barcelona Spain
Working visit to Korea Telecommunications Seoul Korea south
Working visit to satellite manufacturing and launch site Beijing China
Head of Nigeria delegation to the international investors platform at the united nation's I.T.U forum (Nigeria investment session) Bangkok Thailand
The 2016 session of I.T.U Council of ministers Geneva Switzerland
Head of Nigeria delegation to I.T.U plenipotentiary conference PP-18 Dubai UAE
Head,nigeria delegation to I.T.U at workshop of the internet cooperation for assigned names and number (ICANN) Government advisory committee Dubai UAE
One-Day meeting of ministers of  I.C.T in Africa at I.T.U headquarters Geneva Switzerland

Awards and recognition
Emerge Technology Summit Award
Oke-ogun Development Council Award
Nigerian Bar Association Ibadan chapter Award
Nipost Service Award
Technology And Innovation Hall of Fame Delta State Award
Lagos State Chamber Of Commence And Industry Award
Wanostar Merit Award
Society of Family Physician Of Nigeria Award
Association of Telecommunications of Professional of Nigeria Award
National Youth Merit Award
Distinguished Personality Award presented by Muslim media Group Of Nigeria
Worthy Ambassador Award
Youth Focus Initiative Award
Excellence Award
National Association of Muslim Law Student O.A.U Chapter Award
University Of Ibadan School Of Business Award
Freelance independent Broadcasters Of Nigeria Award
Nigerian Computer Society Award
Path on For Loyalty Peace And Security by Nigeria Police Force Award
Nigerian mobile economy Award
TAAC 2018 Award
Association of mobile communication device technician of Nigeria Award
Omolere,Omolasho Nigeria, widows support, orphanage, men and women empowerment skills Award
Business Day Public Service Excellence Award
Cyber security challenge Nigeria Award
Methodist Church of Nigeria,Diocese Ogbomosho special Award
Honorary Degree of Doctor of Public Administration (DPA) by the west Africa University Cotonou Benin Republic
Bayero University,Kano Award

References

Oyo State politicians
Commissioners of state ministries in Nigeria
1953 births
Living people
Obafemi Awolowo University alumni
Muslim writers
Yoruba people